Laiho is a Finnish surname. Notable people with the surname include:

Alexi Laiho, Finnish guitarist and composer
Hanna Laiho (born 1975), Finnish gymnast
Mia Laiho, Finnish politician
Olavi Laiho (1907-1944) Finnish criminal
Samuli Laiho, Finnish guitarist

Finnish-language surnames